Serhiy Priz (born 22 July 1970) is a Ukrainian speed skater. He competed in the men's 5000 metres event at the 1998 Winter Olympics.

References

1970 births
Living people
Ukrainian male speed skaters
Olympic speed skaters of Ukraine
Speed skaters at the 1998 Winter Olympics
Sportspeople from Kharkiv